Exyra is a genus of moths of the family Noctuidae.

Species
 Exyra fax Grote, 1873
 Exyra ridingsii Riley, 1874
 Exyra semicrocea Guenée, 1852

References
 Exyra at Markku Savela's Lepidoptera and Some Other Life Forms
 Natural History Museum Lepidoptera genus database

Plusiinae